Paralympic equestrian competition is a Para-equestrian event that consists of dressage.  It has been part of the Summer Paralympic Games since 1996.

Summary

Medal summary 
Updated to the 2020 Summer Paralympics, all medals are counted in all equestrian events in the Paralympic Games.

Nations

See also
Equestrian at the Summer Olympics

References 

 
Paralympic Games
Equestrian
Para Dressage